Stadion GKS Katowice is a football stadium at Silesian Culture and Recreation Park in Chorzów (just at the border with Katowice), Poland. It is the home ground of GKS Katowice. The stadium also hosted three matches of Poland national football team. Venue holds 6,710 people and was built in 1955. There is a planned full reconstruction of a stadium that will take place in near future.

References 

GKS Katowice
GKS Katowice, Stadion
Buildings and structures in Chorzów
Sports venues in Silesian Voivodeship